The 1998–99 Danish 1st Division season was the 54th season of the Danish 1st Division league championship and the 13th consecutive as a second tier competition governed by the Danish Football Association.

The division-champion and runner-up promoted to the 1999–2000 Danish Superliga. The teams in the 13th to 16th spots were relegated to the 1999–2000 Danish 2nd Division.

Table

Top goalscorers

See also
 1998–99 in Danish football
 1998–99 Danish Superliga

External links
 Peders Fodboldstatistik

Danish 1st Division seasons
Denmark
2